Queensland is the second-largest state in Australia but has the greatest biodiversity, with 684 species of bird recorded (more than closest-rivals New South Wales or West Australia with both around 550).

The high avian biodiversity is probably a reflection of the wide variety of habitats, from desert to rainforest and mangrove forest to mulga, which make Queensland a birders paradise.

This list is based on the 1996 classification by Sibley and Monroe (though there has been a recent (2008) extensive revision of Australian birds by Christidis and Boles), which has resulted in some lumping and splitting. Their system has been developed over nearly two decades and has strong local support, but deviates in important ways from more generally accepted schemes. Supplemental updates follow The Clements Checklist of Birds of the World, 2022 edition.

This list also uses British English throughout.  Any bird names or other wording follows that convention.
The following tags have been used to highlight several categories. The commonly occurring native species do not fall into any of these categories.

 (A) Accidental - a species that rarely or accidentally occurs in Queensland
 (E) Endemic - a species endemic to Queensland
 (I) Introduced - a species introduced to Queensland as a consequence, direct or indirect, of human actions

Ostriches
Order: StruthioniformesFamily: Struthionidae

This order is not native to Australia, but feral populations of one species have become established.

 Common ostrich, Struthio camelus (I)

Cassowaries and emu
Order: CasuariiformesFamily: Casuariidae

This family of flightless ratite birds is represented by two living species in Australia. Another two species are found in New Guinea. The extinct, geographically-isolated King and Kangaroo Island emus were historically considered to be separate species to mainland emus. However, genetic evidence from 2011 suggests that all three are conspecific.

Southern cassowary, Casuarius casuarius 
Emu, Dromaius novaehollandiae

Magpie goose
Order: AnseriformesFamily: Anseranatidae

The family contains a single species, the magpie goose. It was an early and distinctive offshoot of the anseriform family tree, diverging after the screamers and before all other ducks, geese and swans, sometime in the late Cretaceous. The single species is found across Australia.

Magpie goose, Anseranas semipalmata

Ducks, geese, and waterfowl

Order: AnseriformesFamily: Anatidae

The family Anatidae includes the ducks and most duck-like waterfowl, such as geese and swans. These are adapted for an aquatic existence, with webbed feet, bills that are flattened to a greater or lesser extent, and feathers that are excellent at shedding water due to special oils.

Spotted whistling-duck, Dendrocygna guttata 
Plumed whistling-duck, Dendrocygna eytoni 
Wandering whistling-duck, Dendrocygna arcuata
Cape Barren goose, Cereopsis novaehollandiae
Freckled duck, Stictonetta naevosa 
Mute swan, Cygnus olor (I)
Black swan, Cygnus atratus
Radjah shelduck, Radjah radjah
Australian shelduck, Tadorna tadornoides 
Green pygmy-goose, Nettapus pulchellus
Cotton pygmy-goose, Nettapus coromandelianus
Australian wood duck, Chenonetta jubata 
Garganey, Spatula querquedula (A)
Australian shoveler, Spatula rhynchotis
Pacific black duck, Anas superciliosa
Mallard, Anas platyrhynchos (I)
Grey teal, Anas gracilis
Chestnut teal, Anas castanea 
Pink-eared duck, Malacorhynchus membranaceus 
Hardhead, Aythya australis 
Blue-billed duck, Oxyura australis (A)
Musk duck, Biziura lobata

Megapodes
Order: GalliformesFamily: Megapodiidae

Megapodiidae are represented by various species in the Australasian region. They are commonly referred to as "mound-builders" due to their habit of constructing large mounds to incubate their eggs.

Australian brushturkey, Alectura lathami
Orange-footed scrubfowl, Megapodius reinwardt

Guineafowl
Order: GalliformesFamily: Numididae

Numididae are not native to Australia, but feral populations of one species exist in Queensland.

Helmeted guineafowl, Numida meleagris (I)

Pheasants, grouse, and allies
Order: GalliformesFamily: Phasianidae

Phasianidae consists of the pheasants and their allies. These are terrestrial species, variable in size but generally plump, with broad, relatively short wings. Many species are gamebirds or have been domesticated as a food source for humans.

Indian peafowl, Pavo cristatus (I)
Brown quail, Synoicus ypsilophora
Blue-breasted quail, Synoicus chinensis
Stubble quail, Coturnix pectoralis 
Red junglefowl, Gallus gallus (I)
Wild turkey, Meleagris gallopavo (I)

Grebes
Order: PodicipediformesFamily: Podicipedidae

Grebes are small to medium-large freshwater diving birds. They have lobed toes and are excellent swimmers and divers. However, they have their feet placed far back on the body, making them quite ungainly on land.

Australasian grebe, Tachybaptus novaehollandiae
Hoary-headed grebe, Poliocephalus poliocephalus
Great crested grebe, Podiceps cristatus

Pigeons and doves
Order: ColumbiformesFamily: Columbidae

Pigeons and doves are stout-bodied birds with short necks and short slender bills with a fleshy cere.

Rock pigeon, Columba livia (I) 
White-headed pigeon, Columba leucomela
Spotted dove, Streptopelia chinensis (I)
Brown cuckoo-dove, Macropygia phasianella 
Asian emerald dove, Chalcophaps indica
Pacific emerald dove, Chalcophaps longirostris
Common bronzewing, Phaps chalcoptera 
Brush bronzewing, Phaps elegans 
Flock bronzewing, Phaps histrionica 
Crested pigeon, Ocyphaps lophotes 
Spinifex pigeon, Geophaps plumifera 
Squatter pigeon, Geophaps scripta 
Wonga pigeon, Leucosarcia melanoleuca 
Diamond dove, Geopelia cuneata 
Peaceful dove, Geopelia placida
Bar-shouldered dove, Geopelia humeralis
Wompoo fruit-dove, Ptilinopus magnificus
Orange-fronted fruit-dove, Ptilinopus aurantiifrons (A)
Superb fruit-dove, Ptilinopus superbus
Rose-crowned fruit-dove, Ptilinopus regina
Orange-bellied fruit-dove, Ptilinopus iozonus (A)
Elegant imperial-pigeon, Ducula concinna (A)
Pacific imperial-pigeon, Ducula pacifica
Island imperial-pigeon, Ducula pistrinaria
Collared imperial-pigeon, Ducula mullerii 
Torresian imperial-pigeon, Ducula spilorrhoa
Topknot pigeon, Lopholaimus antarcticus

Bustards
Order: OtidiformesFamily: Otididae

Bustards are large terrestrial birds mainly associated with dry open country and steppes in the Old World. They are omnivorous and nest on the ground. They walk steadily on strong legs and big toes, pecking for food as they go. They have long broad wings with "fingered" wingtips and striking patterns in flight. Many have interesting mating displays.

Australian bustard, Ardeotis australis

Cuckoos
Order: CuculiformesFamily: Cuculidae

The family Cuculidae includes cuckoos, roadrunners and anis. These birds are of variable size with slender bodies, long tails and strong legs. The Old World cuckoos are brood parasites.

Pheasant coucal, Centropus phasianinus
Asian koel, Eudynamys scolopaceus
Australian koel, Eudynamys cyanocephalus
Channel-billed cuckoo, Scythrops novaehollandiae
Horsfield's bronze-cuckoo, Chrysococcyx basalis
Black-eared cuckoo, Chrysococcyx osculans 
Shining bronze-cuckoo, Chrysococcyx lucidus
Little bronze-cuckoo, Chrysococcyx minutillus
Pallid cuckoo, Cuculus pallidus
Chestnut-breasted cuckoo, Cacomantis castaneiventris
Fan-tailed cuckoo, Cacomantis flabelliformis
Brush cuckoo, Cacomantis variolosus
Oriental cuckoo, Cuculus optatus

Frogmouths
Order: CaprimulgiformesFamily: Podargidae

The frogmouths are a distinctive group of small nocturnal birds related to swifts found from India across southern Asia to Australia.

Tawny frogmouth, Podargus strigoides 
Marbled frogmouth, Podargus ocellatus
Papuan frogmouth, Podargus papuensis

Nightjars and allies
Order: CaprimulgiformesFamily: Caprimulgidae

Nightjars are medium-sized nocturnal birds that usually nest on the ground. They have long wings, short legs and very short bills. Most have small feet, of little use for walking, and long pointed wings. Their soft plumage is camouflaged to resemble bark or leaves.

Spotted nightjar, Eurostopodus argus
White-throated nightjar, Eurostopodus mystacalis
Large-tailed nightjar, Caprimulgus macrurus

Owlet-nightjars
Order: CaprimulgiformesFamily: Aegothelidae

The owlet-nightjars are a distinctive group of small nocturnal birds related to swifts found from the Maluku Islands and New Guinea to Australia and New Caledonia.

Australian owlet-nightjar, Aegotheles cristatus

Swifts
Order: CaprimulgiformesFamily: Apodidae

Swifts are small birds which spend the majority of their lives flying. These birds have very short legs and never settle voluntarily on the ground, perching instead only on vertical surfaces. Many swifts have long swept-back wings which resemble a crescent or boomerang.

Papuan spinetailed swift, Mearnsia novaeguineae (A)
White-throated needletail, Hirundapus caudacutus
Glossy swiftlet, Collocalia esculenta (A)
Australian swiftlet, Aerodramus terraereginae (E)
Uniform swiftlet, Aerodramus vanikorensis (A)
Pacific swift, Apus pacificus
House swift, Apus nipalensis (A)

Rails, gallinules, and coots
Order: GruiformesFamily: Rallidae

Rallidae is a large family of small to medium-sized birds which includes the rails, crakes, coots and gallinules. Typically they inhabit dense vegetation in damp environments near lakes, swamps or rivers. In general they are shy and secretive birds, making them difficult to observe. Most species have strong legs and long toes which are well adapted to soft uneven surfaces. They tend to have short, rounded wings and to be weak fliers.

Lewin's rail, Lewinia pectoralis
Chestnut rail, Gallirallus castaneoventris
Buff-banded rail, Gallirallus philippensis
Black-tailed nativehen, Tribonyx ventralis
Australian crake, Porzana fluminea 
Dusky moorhen, Gallinula tenebrosa
Eurasian coot, Fulica atra
Australasian swamphen, Porphyrio melanotus
Pale-vented bush-hen, Amaurornis moluccana
White-browed crake, Poliolimnas cinereus
Red-necked crake, Rallina tricolor
Baillon's crake, Zapornia pusilla
Spotless crake, Zapornia tabuensis

Cranes
Order: GruiformesFamily: Gruidae

Cranes are large, long-legged and long-necked birds. Unlike the similar-looking but unrelated herons, cranes fly with necks outstretched, not pulled back. Most have elaborate and noisy courting displays or "dances".

Sarus crane, Antigone antigone 
Brolga, Antigone rubicunda

Thick-knees
Order: CharadriiformesFamily: Burhinidae

The thick-knees are a group of largely tropical waders in the family Burhinidae. They are found worldwide within the tropical zone, with some species also breeding in temperate Europe and Australia. They are medium to large waders with strong black or yellow-black bills, large yellow eyes and cryptic plumage. Despite being classed as waders, most species have a preference for arid or semi-arid habitats.

Bush thick-knee, Burhinus grallarius 
Beach thick-knee, Esacus magnirostris

Stilts and avocets
Order: CharadriiformesFamily: Recurvirostridae

Recurvirostridae is a family of large wading birds, which includes the avocets and stilts. The avocets have long legs and long up-curved bills. The stilts have extremely long legs and long, thin straight bills.

Pied stilt, Himantopus leucocephalus
Banded stilt, Cladorhynchus leucocephalus (A)
Red-necked avocet, Recurvirostra novaehollandiae

Oystercatchers
Order: CharadriiformesFamily: Haematopodidae

The oystercatchers are large and noisy plover-like birds, with strong bills used for smashing or prising open molluscs.

Pied oystercatcher, Haematopus longirostris
South Island oystercatcher, Haematopus finschi (A)
Sooty oystercatcher, Haematopus fuliginosus

Plovers and lapwings
Order: CharadriiformesFamily: Charadriidae

The family Charadriidae includes the plovers, dotterels and lapwings. They are small to medium-sized birds with compact bodies, short, thick necks and long, usually pointed, wings. They are found in open country worldwide, mostly in habitats near water.

Black-bellied plover, Pluvialis squatarola
American golden-plover, Pluvialis dominica (A)
Pacific golden-plover, Pluvialis fulva
Banded lapwing, Vanellus tricolor 
Masked lapwing, Vanellus miles
Lesser sand-plover, Charadrius mongolus
Greater sand-plover, Charadrius leschenaultii
Double-banded plover, Charadrius bicinctus
Red-capped plover, Charadrius ruficapillus
Common ringed plover, Charadrius hiaticula (A)
Semipalmated plover, Charadrius semipalmatus (A)
Little ringed plover, Charadrius dubius (A)
Oriental plover, Charadrius veredus
Red-kneed dotterel, Erythrogonys cinctus 
Hooded plover, Thinornis cucullatus (A)
Black-fronted dotterel, Elseyornis melanops
Inland dotterel, Peltohyas australis

Plains-wanderer
Order: CharadriiformesFamily: Pedionomidae

The plains-wanderer is a quail-like ground bird. They are excellent camouflagers, and will first hide at any disturbance. If they're approached too close, they will run as opposed to flying, which they are very poor at.

Plains-wanderer, Pedionomus torquatus

Painted-snipes
Order: CharadriiformesFamily: Rostratulidae

Painted-snipes are short-legged, long-billed birds similar in shape to the true snipes, but more brightly coloured.

Australian painted-snipe, Rostratula australis

Jacanas
Order: CharadriiformesFamily: Jacanidae

The jacanas are a group of waders found throughout the tropics. They are identifiable by their huge feet and claws which enable them to walk on floating vegetation in the shallow lakes that are their preferred habitat.

Comb-crested jacana, Irediparra gallinacea

Sandpipers and allies
Order: CharadriiformesFamily: Scolopacidae

Scolopacidae is a large diverse family of small to medium-sized shorebirds including the sandpipers, curlews, godwits, shanks, tattlers, woodcocks, snipes, dowitchers, and phalaropes. The majority of these species eat small invertebrates picked out of the mud or soil. Variation in length of legs and bills enables multiple species to feed in the same habitat, particularly on the coast, without direct competition for food.

Whimbrel, Numenius phaeopus
Little curlew, Numenius minutus
Far Eastern curlew, Numenius madagascariensis
Bar-tailed godwit, Limosa lapponica
Black-tailed godwit, Limosa limosa
Ruddy turnstone, Arenaria interpres
Great knot, Calidris tenuirostris
Red knot, Calidris canutus
Ruff, Calidris pugnax
Broad-billed sandpiper, Calidris falcinellus
Sharp-tailed sandpiper, Calidris acuminata
Curlew sandpiper, Calidris ferruginea
Long-toed stint, Calidris subminuta
Sanderling, Calidris alba
Dunlin, Calidris alpina (A)
Little stint, Calidris minuta (A)
Buff-breasted sandpiper, Calidris subruficollis (A)
Pectoral sandpiper, Calidris melanotos (A)
Asian dowitcher, Limnodromus semipalmatus (A)
Latham's snipe, Gallinago hardwickii
Swinhoe's snipe, Gallinago megala
Terek sandpiper, Xenus cinereus
Red-necked phalarope, Phalaropus lobatus (A)
Common sandpiper, Actitis hypoleucos
Grey-tailed tattler, Tringa brevipes
Wandering tattler, Tringa incana
Common greenshank, Tringa nebularia
Lesser yellowlegs, Tringa flavipes (A)
Marsh sandpiper, Tringa stagnatilis
Wood sandpiper, Tringa glareola
Common redshank, Tringa totanus (A)

Buttonquail
Order: CharadriiformesFamily: Turnicidae

The buttonquails are small, drab, running birds which resemble the true quails. The female is the brighter of the sexes and initiates courtship. The male incubates the eggs and tends the young.

Red-backed buttonquail, Turnix maculosus
Black-breasted buttonquail, Turnix melanogaster 
Buff-breasted buttonquail, Turnix olivii (E)
Painted buttonquail, Turnix varius
Red-chested buttonquail, Turnix pyrrhothorax 
Little buttonquail, Turnix velox

Pratincoles and coursers
Order: CharadriiformesFamily: Glareolidae

Glareolidae is a family of wading birds comprising the pratincoles, which have short legs, long pointed wings, and long forked tails, and the coursers, which have long legs, short wings, and long, pointed bills which curve downwards.

Australian pratincole, Stiltia isabella
Oriental pratincole, Glareola maldivarum

Skuas and jaegers
Order: CharadriiformesFamily: Stercorariidae

The family Stercorariidae are, in general, medium to large birds, typically with grey or brown plumage, often with white markings on the wings. They nest on the ground in temperate and arctic regions and are long-distance migrants.

South polar skua, Stercorarius maccormicki (A)
Brown skua, Stercorarius antarcticus
Pomarine jaeger, Stercorarius pomarinus
Parasitic jaeger, Stercorarius parasiticus
Long-tailed jaeger, Stercorarius longicaudus (A)

Gulls, terns, and skimmers
Order: CharadriiformesFamily: Laridae

Laridae is a family of medium to large seabirds, the gulls, terns, and skimmers. Gulls are typically grey or white, often with black markings on the head or wings. They have stout, longish bills and webbed feet. Terns are a group of generally medium to large seabirds typically with grey or white plumage, often with black markings on the head. Most terns hunt fish by diving but some pick insects off the surface of fresh water. Terns are generally long-lived birds, with several species known to live in excess of 30 years. Skimmers are a small family of tropical tern-like birds. They have an elongated lower mandible which they use to feed by flying low over the water surface and skimming the water for small fish.

Silver gull, Chroicocephalus novaehollandiae
Black-headed gull, Chroicocephalus ridibundus (A)
Laughing gull, Leucophaeus atricilla (A)
Franklin's gull, Leucophaeus pipixcan (A)
Black-tailed gull, Larus crassirostris (A)
Pacific gull, Larus pacificus (A)
Slaty-backed gull, Larus schistisagus (A)
Kelp gull, Larus dominicanus (A)
Brown noddy, Anous stolidus
Black noddy, Anous minutus
Grey noddy, Anous albivitta (A)
White tern, Gygis alba
Sooty tern, Onychoprion fuscatus
Bridled tern, Onychoprion anaethetus
Little tern, Sternula albifrons
Australian fairy tern, Sternula nereis (A)
Gull-billed tern, Gelochelidon nilotica
Caspian tern, Hydroprogne caspia
White-winged tern, Chlidonias leucopterus
Whiskered tern, Chlidonias hybrida
Roseate tern, Sterna dougallii
White-fronted tern, Sterna striata
Black-naped tern, Sterna sumatrana
Common tern, Sterna hirundo
Arctic tern, Sterna paradisaea (A)
Great crested tern, Thalasseus bergii
Lesser crested tern, Thalasseus bengalensis

Tropicbirds
Order: PhaethontiformesFamily: Phaethontidae

Tropicbirds are slender white birds of tropical oceans, with exceptionally long central tail feathers. Their long wings have black markings, as does the head.

White-tailed tropicbird, Phaethon lepturus
Red-tailed tropicbird, Phaethon rubricauda

Penguins
Order: SphenisciformesFamily: Spheniscidae

Penguins are a group of aquatic, flightless birds living almost exclusively in the Southern Hemisphere, especially in Antarctica. Only one species, the little penguin, breeds on the Australian coast.

Little penguin, Eudyptula minor

Albatrosses
Order: ProcellariiformesFamily: Diomedeidae

The albatrosses are a family of large seabird found across the Southern and North Pacific Oceans. The largest are among the largest flying birds in the world.

Yellow-nosed albatross, Thalassarche chlororhynchos
Grey-headed albatross, Thalassarche chrysostoma (A)
Buller's albatross, Thalassarche bulleri (A)
White-capped albatross, Thalassarche cauta
Salvin's albatross, Thalassarche salvini (A)
Black-browed albatross, Thalassarche melanophris
Sooty albatross, Phoebetria fusca (A)
Light-mantled albatross, Phoebetria palpebrata (A)
Royal albatross, Diomedea epomophora
Wandering albatross, Diomedea exulans

Southern storm-petrels
Order: ProcellariiformesFamily: Oceanitidae

The southern storm-petrels are the smallest seabirds, relatives of the petrels, feeding on planktonic crustaceans and small fish picked from the surface, typically while hovering. Their flight is fluttering and sometimes bat-like.

Wilson's storm-petrel, Oceanites oceanicus
White-faced storm-petrel, Pelagodroma marina
White-bellied storm-petrel, Fregetta grallaria (A)
New Zealand storm-petrel, Fregetta maoriana (A)
Black-bellied storm-petrel, Fregetta tropica (A)
Polynesian storm-petrel, Nesofregetta fuliginosa (A)

Northern storm-petrels
Order: ProcellariiformesFamily: Hydrobatidae

Though the members of this family are similar in many respects to the southern storm-petrels, including their general appearance and habits, there are enough genetic differences to warrant their placement in a separate family.

Leach's storm-petrel, Hydrobates leucorhous (A)
Band-rumped storm-petrel, Hydrobates castro (A)
Matsudaira's storm-petrel, Hydrobates matsudairae

Shearwaters and petrels
Order: ProcellariiformesFamily: Procellariidae

The procellariids are the main group of medium-sized "true petrels", characterised by united nostrils with medium nasal septum, and a long outer functional primary flight feather.

Southern giant-petrel, Macronectes giganteus 
Northern giant-petrel, Macronectes halli (A)
Southern fulmar, Fulmarus glacialoides (A)
Cape petrel, Daption capense
Great-winged petrel, Pterodroma macroptera
Grey-faced petrel, Pterodroma gouldi (A)
Kermadec petrel, Pterodroma neglecta 
Herald petrel, Pterodroma heraldica (A)
Providence petrel, Pterodroma solandri 
Soft-plumaged petrel, Pterodroma mollis (A)
White-headed petrel, Pterodroma lessonii (A)
Mottled petrel, Pterodroma inexpectata (A)
Juan Fernandez petrel, Pterodroma externa (A) 
White-necked petrel, Pterodroma cervicalis
Black-winged petrel, Pterodroma nigripennis
Cook's petrel, Pterodroma cookii (A) 
Gould's petrel, Pterodroma leucoptera (A) 
Collared petrel, Pterodroma brevipes (A)
Stejneger's petrel, Pterodroma longirostris (A)
Fairy prion, Pachyptila turtur
Broad-billed prion, Pachyptila vittata (A)
Salvin's prion, Pachyptila salvini
Antarctic prion, Pachyptila desolata (A)
Slender-billed prion, Pachyptila belcheri (A)
Bulwer's petrel, Bulweria bulwerii (A)
Tahiti petrel, Pseudobulweria rostrata 
White-chinned petrel, Procellaria aequinoctialis (A)
Parkinson's petrel, Procellaria parkinsoni (A)
Westland petrel, Procellaria westlandica (A)
Streaked shearwater, Calonectris leucomelas
Flesh-footed shearwater, Ardenna carneipes
Wedge-tailed shearwater, Ardenna pacifica
Buller's shearwater, Ardenna bulleri 
Sooty shearwater, Ardenna grisea
Short-tailed shearwater, Ardenna tenuirostris
Hutton's shearwater, Puffinus huttoni
Fluttering shearwater, Puffinus gavia
Little shearwater, Puffinus assimilis (A)
Tropical shearwater, Puffinus bailloni (A)
Common diving-petrel, Pelecanoides urinatrix (A)

Storks
Order: CiconiiformesFamily: Ciconiidae

Storks are large, long-legged, long-necked, wading birds with long, stout bills. Storks are mute, but bill-clattering is an important mode of communication at the nest. Their nests can be large and may be reused for many years.

Black-necked stork, Ephippiorhynchus asiaticus

Frigatebirds
Order: SuliformesFamily: Fregatidae

Frigatebirds are large seabirds usually found over tropical oceans. They are large, black, or black-and-white, with long wings and deeply forked tails. The males have coloured inflatable throat pouches. They do not swim or walk and cannot take off from a flat surface. Having the largest wingspan-to-body-weight ratio of any bird, they are essentially aerial, able to stay aloft for more than a week.

Lesser frigatebird, Fregata ariel
Great frigatebird, Fregata minor

Boobies and gannets
Order: SuliformesFamily: Sulidae

The sulids comprise the gannets and boobies. Both groups are medium-large coastal seabirds that plunge-dive for fish.

Masked booby, Sula dactylatra
Brown booby, Sula leucogaster
Red-footed booby, Sula sula
Australasian gannet, Morus serrator

Anhingas
Order: SuliformesFamily: Anhingidae

Anhingas or darters are cormorant-like water birds with long necks and long, straight bills. They are fish eaters which often swim with only their neck above the water.

Australasian darter, Anhinga novaehollandiae

Cormorants and shags
Order: SuliformesFamily: Phalacrocoracidae

Cormorants are medium-to-large aquatic birds, usually with mainly dark plumage and areas of coloured skin on the face. The bill is long, thin and sharply hooked. Their feet are four-toed and webbed, a distinguishing feature among the order Pelecaniformes.

Little pied cormorant, Microcarbo melanoleucos
Great cormorant, Phalacrocorax carbo
Little black cormorant, Phalacrocorax sulcirostris
Pied cormorant, Phalacrocorax varius

Pelicans
Order: PelecaniformesFamily: Pelecanidae

Pelicans are large water birds with distinctive pouches under their bills. Like other birds in the order Pelecaniformes, they have four webbed toes.

Australian pelican, Pelecanus conspicillatus

Herons, egrets, and bitterns 
Order: PelecaniformesFamily: Ardeidae

The family Ardeidae contains the bitterns, herons, and egrets. Herons and egrets are medium to large wading birds with long necks and legs. Bitterns tend to be shorter necked and more wary. Members of Ardeidae fly with their necks retracted, unlike other long-necked birds such as storks, ibises, and spoonbills.

Australasian bittern, Botaurus poiciloptilus
Yellow bittern, Ixobrychus sinensis (A)
Black-backed bittern, Ixobrychus dubius
Black bittern, Ixobrychus flavicollis 
Pacific heron, Ardea pacifica
Great-billed heron, Ardea sumatrana
Great egret, Ardea alba
Intermediate egret, Ardea intermedia
White-faced heron, Egretta novaehollandiae
Little egret, Egretta garzetta
Pacific reef-heron, Egretta sacra
Pied heron, Egretta picata
Cattle egret, Bubulcus ibis
Striated heron, Butorides striata
Nankeen night-heron, Nycticorax caledonicus

Ibises and spoonbills
Order: PelecaniformesFamily: Threskiornithidae

Threskiornithidae is a family of large terrestrial and wading birds which includes the ibises and spoonbills. They have long, broad wings with 11 primary and about 20 secondary feathers. They are strong fliers and despite their size and weight, very capable soarers.

Glossy ibis, Plegadis falcinellus
Australian ibis, Threskiornis moluccus
Straw-necked ibis, Threskiornis spinicollis
Royal spoonbill, Platalea regia
Yellow-billed spoonbill, Platalea flavipes

Osprey
Order: AccipitriformesFamily: Pandionidae

The family Pandionidae contains only one species, the osprey. The osprey is a medium-large raptor which is a specialist fish-eater with a worldwide distribution.

Osprey, Pandion haliaetus

Hawks, eagles, and kites
Order: AccipitriformesFamily: Accipitridae

Accipitridae is a family of birds of prey, which includes hawks, eagles, kites, harriers and Old World vultures. These birds have powerful hooked beaks for tearing flesh from their prey, strong legs, powerful talons and keen eyesight.

Black-shouldered kite, Elanus axillaris 
Letter-winged kite, Elanus scriptus 
Black-breasted kite, Hamirostra melanosternon 
Square-tailed kite, Lophoictinia isura 
Pacific baza, Aviceda subcristata
Little eagle, Hieraaetus morphnoides
Gurney's eagle, Aquila gurneyi (A)
Wedge-tailed eagle, Aquila audax
Swamp harrier, Circus approximans
Spotted harrier, Circus assimilis
Grey goshawk, Accipiter novaehollandiae
Brown goshawk, Accipiter fasciatus
Collared sparrowhawk, Accipiter cirrocephalus
Red goshawk, Erythrotriorchis radiatus
Black kite, Milvus migrans
Whistling kite, Haliastur sphenurus
Brahminy kite, Haliastur indus
White-bellied sea-eagle, Haliaeetus leucogaster

Barn-owls
Order: StrigiformesFamily: Tytonidae

Barn-owls are medium to large owls with large heads and characteristic heart-shaped faces. They have long strong legs with powerful talons.

Sooty owl, Tyto tenebricosa
Australian masked-owl, Tyto novaehollandiae
Australasian grass-owl, Tyto longimembris
Barn owl, Tyto alba

Owls
Order: StrigiformesFamily: Strigidae

The typical owls are small to large solitary nocturnal birds of prey. They have large forward-facing eyes and ears, a hawk-like beak, and a conspicuous circle of feathers around each eye called a facial disk.

Rufous owl, Ninox rufa
Powerful owl, Ninox strenua 
Barking owl, Ninox connivens
Southern boobook, Ninox boobook
Morepork, Ninox novaeseelandiae

Kingfishers
Order: CoraciiformesFamily: Alcedinidae

Kingfishers are medium-sized birds with large heads, long pointed bills, short legs, and stubby tails.

Azure kingfisher, Ceyx azureus
Little kingfisher, Ceyx pusillus
Laughing kookaburra, Dacelo novaeguineae 
Blue-winged kookaburra, Dacelo leachii
Red-backed kingfisher, Todiramphus pyrrhopygius 
Forest kingfisher, Todiramphus macleayii
Torresian kingfisher, Todiramphus sordidus
Sacred kingfisher, Todiramphus sanctus
Yellow-billed kingfisher, Syma torotoro
Little paradise-kingfisher, Tanysiptera hydrocharis (A)
Buff-breasted paradise-kingfisher, Tanysiptera sylvia

Bee-eaters
Order: CoraciiformesFamily: Meropidae

The bee-eaters are a group of near passerine birds in the family Meropidae. Most species are found in Africa but others occur in southern Europe, Madagascar, Australia, and New Guinea. They are characterised by richly coloured plumage, slender bodies, and usually elongated central tail feathers. All are colourful and have long downturned bills and pointed wings, which give them a swallow-like appearance when seen from afar.

Rainbow bee-eater, Merops ornatus

Rollers
Order: CoraciiformesFamily: Coraciidae

Rollers resemble crows in size and build, but are more closely related to the kingfishers and bee-eaters. They share the colourful appearance of those groups with blues and browns predominating. The two inner front toes are connected, but the outer toe is not.

Dollarbird, Eurystomus orientalis

Falcons and caracaras
Order: FalconiformesFamily: Falconidae

Falconidae is a family of diurnal birds of prey. They differ from hawks, eagles, and kites in that they kill with their beaks instead of their talons.

Nankeen kestrel, Falco cenchroides
Australian hobby, Falco longipennis
Brown falcon, Falco berigora
Grey falcon, Falco hypoleucos 
Black falcon, Falco subniger 
Peregrine falcon, Falco peregrinus

Cockatoos
Order: PsittaciformesFamily:  Cacatuidae

The cockatoos share many features with other parrots including the characteristic curved beak shape and a zygodactyl foot, with two forward toes and two backwards toes. They differ, however in a number of characteristics, including the often spectacular movable headcrest.

Palm cockatoo, Probosciger aterrimus 
Red-tailed black-cockatoo, Calyptorhynchus banksii 
Glossy black-cockatoo, Calyptorhynchus lathami 
Yellow-tailed black-cockatoo, Calyptorhynchus funereus 
Pink cockatoo, Lophochroa leadbeateri 
Galah, Eolophus roseicapilla
Long-billed corella, Cacatua tenuirostris (I)
Little corella, Cacatua sanguinea
Sulphur-crested cockatoo, Cacatua galerita
Cockatiel, Nymphicus hollandicus

Old World parrots
Order: PsittaciformesFamily: Psittaculidae

Characteristic features of parrots include a strong curved bill, an upright stance, strong legs, and clawed zygodactyl feet. Many parrots are vividly coloured, and some are multi-coloured. Old World parrots are found from Africa east across south and southeast Asia and Oceania to Australia and New Zealand.

Superb parrot, Polytelis swainsonii (A)
Australian king-parrot, Alisterus scapularis 
Red-winged parrot, Aprosmictus erythropterus
Eclectus parrot, Eclectus roratus
Red-cheeked parrot, Geoffroyus geoffroyi
Ground parrot, Pezoporus wallicus 
Night parrot, Pezoporus occidentalis 
Bourke's parrot, Neophema bourkii 
Blue-winged parrot, Neophema chrysostoma 
Turquoise parrot, Neophema pulchella 
Scarlet-chested parrot, Neophema splendida
Swift parrot, Lathamus discolor 
Australian ringneck, Barnardius barnardi
Crimson rosella, Platycercus elegans 
Northern rosella, Platycercus venustus 
Eastern rosella, Platycercus eximius 
Pale-headed rosella, Platycercus adscitus
Greater bluebonnet, Northiella haematogaster
Red-rumped parrot, Psephotus haematonotus 
Mulga parrot, Psephotus varius
Golden-shouldered parrot, Psephotus chrysopterygius (E)
Paradise parrot, Psephotus pulcherrimus
Red-capped parrot, Purpureicephalus spurius
Double-eyed fig-parrot, Cyclopsitta diophthalma
Budgerigar, Melopsittacus undulatus 
Musk lorikeet, Glossopsitta concinna 
Little lorikeet, Parvipsitta pusilla 
Varied lorikeet, Psitteuteles versicolor
Coconut lorikeet, Trichoglossus haematodus
Red-collared lorikeet, Trichoglossus rubritorquis
Rainbow lorikeet, Trichoglossus moluccanus
Scaly-breasted lorikeet, Trichoglossus chlorolepidotus

Pittas
Order: PasseriformesFamily: Pittidae

Pittas are medium-sized by passerine standards and are stocky, with fairly long, strong legs, short tails, and stout bills. Many are brightly coloured. They spend the majority of their time on wet forest floors, eating snails, insects, and similar invertebrates.

Papuan pitta, Erythropitta macklotii
Noisy pitta, Pitta versicolor

Lyrebirds
Order: PasseriformesFamily: Menuridae

Lyrebirds are most notable for their superb ability to mimic natural and artificial sounds from their environment, and the striking beauty of the male bird's huge tail when it is fanned out in courtship display.

Albert's lyrebird, Menura alberti 
Superb lyrebird, Menura novaehollandiae

Scrub-birds
Order: PasseriformesFamily: Atrichornithidae

The scrub-bird family is ancient and is understood to be most closely related to the lyrebirds, and probably also the bowerbirds and treecreepers.

Rufous scrub-bird, Atrichornis rufescens

Bowerbirds
Order: PasseriformesFamily: Ptilonorhynchidae

The bowerbirds are small to medium-sized passerine birds. The males notably build a bower to attract a mate. Depending on the species, the bower ranges from a circle of cleared earth with a small pile of twigs in the center to a complex and highly decorated structure of sticks and leaves.

Spotted catbird, Ailuroedus melanotis (E)
Black-eared catbird, Ailuroedus melanotis
Green catbird, Ailuroedus crassirostris 
Tooth-billed bowerbird, Scenopoeetes dentirostris (E)
Golden bowerbird, Amblyornis newtoniana (E)
Regent bowerbird, Sericulus chrysocephalus 
Satin bowerbird, Ptilonorhynchus violaceus 
Spotted bowerbird, Chlamydera maculata 
Great bowerbird, Chlamydera nuchalis 
Fawn-breasted bowerbird, Chlamydera cerviniventris

Australasian treecreepers
Order: PasseriformesFamily: Climacteridae

The Climacteridae are medium-small, mostly brown-coloured birds with patterning on their underparts.

White-throated treecreeper, Cormobates leucophaea 
White-browed treecreeper, Climacteris affinis 
Red-browed treecreeper, Climacteris erythrops 
Brown treecreeper, Climacteris picumnus 
Black-tailed treecreeper, Climacteris melanurus

Fairywrens
Order: PasseriformesFamily: Maluridae

Maluridae is a family of small, insectivorous passerine birds endemic to Australia and New Guinea. They are socially monogamous and sexually promiscuous, meaning that although they form pairs between one male and one female, each partner will mate with other individuals and even assist in raising the young from such pairings.

Grey grasswren, Amytornis barbatus
Opalton grasswren, Amytornis rowleyi (E)
Carpentarian grasswren, Amytornis dorotheae 
Short-tailed grasswren, Amytornis merrotsyi
Eyrean grasswren, Amytornis goyderi 
Kalkadoon grasswren, Amytornis ballarae (E)
Southern emuwren, Stipiturus malachurus 
Rufous-crowned emuwren, Stipiturus ruficeps 
Purple-crowned fairywren, Malurus coronatus 
Purple-backed fairywren, Malurus assimilis 
Variegated fairywren, Malurus lamberti 
Lovely fairywren, Malurus amabilis (E)
Splendid fairywren, Malurus splendens
Superb fairywren, Malurus cyaneus 
White-winged fairywren, Malurus leucopterus 
Red-backed fairywren, Malurus melanocephalus

Honeyeaters
Order: PasseriformesFamily: Meliphagidae

The honeyeaters are a large and diverse family of small to medium-sized birds most common in Australia and New Guinea. They are nectar feeders and closely resemble other nectar-feeding passerines.

Eastern spinebill, Acanthorhynchus tenuirostris
Pied honeyeater, Certhionyx variegatus
Yellow-spotted honeyeater, Meliphaga notata (E)
Lewin's honeyeater, Meliphaga lewinii 
Graceful honeyeater, Microptilotis gracilis
Cryptic honeyeater, Microptilotis imitatrix (E)
Yellow honeyeater, Stomiopera flava (E)
White-gaped honeyeater, Stomiopera unicolor
White-fronted honeyeater, Purnella albifrons 
Yellow-faced honeyeater, Caligavis chrysops 
Yellow-tufted honeyeater, Lichenostomus melanops
Bell miner, Manorina melanophrys 
Noisy miner, Manorina melanocephala 
Yellow-throated miner, Manorina flavigula 
Bridled honeyeater, Bolemoreus frenatus (E)
Eungella honeyeater, Bolemoreus hindwoodi (E)
Spiny-cheeked honeyeater, Acanthagenys rufogularis
Little wattlebird, Anthochaera chrysoptera  
Regent honeyeater, Anthochaera phrygia 
Red wattlebird, Anthochaera carunculata 
Varied honeyeater, Gavicalis versicolor
Mangrove honeyeater, Gavicalis fasciogularis 
Singing honeyeater, Gavicalis virescens 
White-plumed honeyeater, Ptilotula penicillata
Yellow-tinted honeyeater, Ptilotula flavescens
Fuscous honeyeater, Ptilotula fusca 
Grey-headed honeyeater, Ptilotula keartlandi 
Grey-fronted honeyeater, Ptilotula plumula 
Brown-backed honeyeater, Ramsayornis modestus
Bar-breasted honeyeater, Ramsayornis fasciatus (E)
Rufous-banded honeyeater, Conopophila albogularis
Rufous-throated honeyeater, Conopophila rufogularis 
Grey honeyeater, Conopophila whitei
Gibber chat, Ashbyia lovensis 
Yellow chat, Epthianura crocea
Crimson chat, Epthianura tricolor 
Orange chat, Epthianura aurifrons  
White-fronted chat, Epthianura albifrons
Black honeyeater, Sugomel niger
Dusky myzomela, Myzomela obscura
Red-headed myzomela, Myzomela erythrocephala
Scarlet myzomela, Myzomela sanguinolenta
Green-backed honeyeater, Glycichaera fallax
Banded honeyeater, Cissomela pectoralis 
Brown honeyeater, Lichmera indistincta
New Holland honeyeater, Phylidonyris novaehollandiae 
White-cheeked honeyeater, Phylidonyris niger 
White-streaked honeyeater, Trichodere cockerelli (E)
White-eared honeyeater, Nesoptilotis leucotis 
Blue-faced honeyeater, Entomyzon cyanotis
White-throated honeyeater, Melithreptus albogularis
White-naped honeyeater, Melithreptus lunatus 
Brown-headed honeyeater, Melithreptus brevirostris 
Black-chinned honeyeater, Melithreptus gularis 
Tawny-breasted honeyeater, Xanthotis flaviventer
Macleay's honeyeater, Xanthotis macleayanus  (E)
Striped honeyeater, Plectorhyncha lanceolata
Painted honeyeater, Grantiella picta 
Little friarbird, Philemon citreogularis
Helmeted friarbird, Philemon buceroides
Silver-crowned friarbird, Philemon argenticeps 
Noisy friarbird, Philemon corniculatus

Bristlebirds
Order: PasseriformesFamily: Dasyornithidae

Bristlebirds are long-tailed, sedentary, ground-frequenting birds. The common name of the family is derived from the presence of prominent rictal bristles - three stiff, hair-like feathers curving downwards on either side of the gape.

Eastern bristlebird, Dasyornis brachypterus

Pardalotes
Order: PasseriformesFamily: Pardalotidae

Pardalotes spend most of their time high in the outer foliage of trees, feeding on insects, spiders, and above all lerps (a type of sap-sucking insect).

Spotted pardalote, Pardalotus punctatus 
Red-browed pardalote, Pardalotus rubricatus 
Striated pardalote, Pardalotus striatus

Thornbills and allies
Order: PasseriformesFamily: Acanthizidae

Thornbills are small passerine birds, similar in habits to the tits.

Fernwren, Oreoscopus gutturalis (E)
Yellow-throated scrubwren, Sericornis citreogularis 
White-browed scrubwren, Sericornis frontalis 
Atherton scrubwren, Sericornis keri (E)
Tropical scrubwren, Sericornis beccarii
Large-billed scrubwren, Sericornis magnirostra 
Redthroat, Pyrrholaemus brunneus 
Speckled warbler, Pyrrholaemus sagittatus 
Rufous fieldwren, Calamanthus campestris 
Chestnut-rumped heathwren, Hylacola pyrrhopygia 
Buff-rumped thornbill, Acanthiza reguloides 
Mountain thornbill, Acanthiza katherina (E)
Brown thornbill, Acanthiza pusilla 
Inland thornbill, Acanthiza apicalis 
Yellow-rumped thornbill, Acanthiza chrysorrhoa 
Chestnut-rumped thornbill, Acanthiza uropygialis 
Slaty-backed thornbill, Acanthiza robustirostris 
Yellow thornbill, Acanthiza nana 
Striated thornbill, Acanthiza lineata 
Weebill, Smicrornis brevirostris 
Fairy gerygone, Gerygone palpebrosa
White-throated gerygone, Gerygone olivacea
Large-billed gerygone, Gerygone magnirostris
Brown gerygone, Gerygone mouki 
Western gerygone, Gerygone fusca 
Mangrove gerygone, Gerygone levigaster
Southern whiteface, Aphelocephala leucopsis
Banded whiteface, Aphelocephala nigricincta

Pseudo-babblers
Order: PasseriformesFamily: Pomatostomidae

The pseudo-babblers are small to medium-sized birds endemic to Australia and New Guinea. They are ground-feeding omnivores and highly social.

Grey-crowned babbler, Pomatostomus temporalis
White-browed babbler, Pomatostomus superciliosus 
Hall's babbler, Pomatostomus halli 
Chestnut-crowned babbler, Pomatostomus ruficeps

Logrunners
Order: PasseriformesFamily: Orthonychidae

The Orthonychidae is a family of birds with a single genus, Orthonyx, which comprises two types of passerine birds endemic to Australia and New Guinea, the logrunners and the chowchilla. Both use stiffened tails to brace themselves when feeding.

Australian logrunner, Orthonyx temminckii
Chowchilla, Orthonyx spaldingii (E)

Quail-thrushes and jewel-babblers
Order: PasseriformesFamily: Cinclosomatidae

The Cinclosomatidae is a family containing jewel-babblers and quail-thrushes.

Spotted quail-thrush, Cinclosoma punctatum 
Chestnut-breasted quail-thrush, Cinclosoma castaneothorax 
Cinnamon quail-thrush, Cinclosoma cinnamomeum

Cuckooshrikes
Order: PasseriformesFamily: Campephagidae

The cuckooshrikes are small to medium-sized passerine birds. They are predominantly greyish with white and black, although some species are brightly coloured.

Ground cuckooshrike, Coracina maxima 
Barred cuckooshrike, Coracina lineata
Black-faced cuckooshrike, Coracina novaehollandiae
White-bellied cuckooshrike, Coracina papuensis
White-winged triller, Lalage tricolor
Varied triller, Lalage leucomela
Common cicadabird,  Edolisoma tenuirostre

Sittellas
Order: PasseriformesFamily: Neosittidae

The sittellas are a family of small passerine birds found only in Australasia. They resemble treecreepers, but have soft tails.

Papuan sittella, Neositta papuensis
Varied sittella, Neositta chrysoptera

Whipbirds and wedgebills
Order: PasseriformesFamily: Psophodidae

The Psophodidae is a family containing whipbirds and wedgebills.

Eastern whipbird, Psophodes olivaceus
Chiming wedgebill, Psophodes occidentalis
Chirruping wedgebill, Psophodes cristatus

Australo-Papuan bellbirds
Order: PasseriformesFamily: Oreoicidae

The three species contained in the family have been moved around between  different families for fifty years. A series of studies of the DNA of Australian birds between 2006 and 2001 found strong support for treating the three genera as a new family, which was formally named in 2016.

Crested bellbird, Oreoica gutturalis

Shrike-tits
Order: PasseriformesFamily: Falcunculidae

The shrike-tits have a parrot-like bill, used for distinctive bark-stripping behaviour, which gains it access to invertebrates

Eastern shrike-tit, Falcunculus frontatus

Whistlers and allies
Order: PasseriformesFamily: Pachycephalidae

The family Pachycephalidae includes the whistlers, shrikethrushes, and some of the pitohuis.

Sandstone shrikethrush, Colluricincla woodwardi 
Bower's shrikethrush, Colluricincla boweri (E)
Grey shrikethrush, Colluricincla harmonica
Rufous shrikethrush, Colluricincla rufogaster
Olive whistler, Pachycephala olivacea 
Golden whistler, Pachycephala pectoralis
Black-tailed whistler, Pachycephala melanura
Gray whistler, Pachycephala simplex
Rufous whistler, Pachycephala rufiventris
White-breasted whistler, Pachycephala lanioides

Old World orioles
Order: PasseriformesFamily: Oriolidae

The Old World orioles are colourful passerine birds. They are not related to the New World orioles.

Olive-backed oriole, Oriolus sagittatus
Green oriole, Oriolus flavocinctus
Australasian figbird, Sphecotheres vieilloti

Boatbills
Order: PasseriformesFamily: Machaerirhynchidae

The boatbills have affinities to woodswallows and butcherbirds, and are distributed across New Guinea and northern Queensland.

Yellow-breasted boatbill, Machaerirhynchus flaviventer

Woodswallows, bellmagpies, and allies
Order: PasseriformesFamily: Artamidae

The woodswallows are soft-plumaged, somber-coloured passerine birds. They are smooth, agile flyers with moderately large, semi-triangular wings. The cracticids: currawongs, bellmagpies and butcherbirds, are similar to the other corvids. They have large, straight bills and mostly black, white or grey plumage. All are omnivorous to some degree.

White-breasted woodswallow, Artamus leucorynchus
Masked woodswallow, Artamus personatus 
White-browed woodswallow, Artamus superciliosus 
Black-faced woodswallow, Artamus cinereus
Dusky woodswallow, Artamus cyanopterus
Little woodswallow, Artamus minor 
Black-backed butcherbird, Cracticus mentalis
Grey butcherbird, Cracticus torquatus 
Pied butcherbird, Cracticus nigrogularis
Black butcherbird, Cracticus quoyi
Australian magpie, Gymnorhina tibicen
Pied currawong, Strepera graculina

Fantails
Order: PasseriformesFamily: Rhipiduridae

The fantails are small insectivorous birds which are specialist aerial feeders.

Northern fantail, Rhipidura rufiventris
Willie-wagtail, Rhipidura leucophrys
Rufous fantail, Rhipidura rufifrons
Arafura fantail, Rhipidura dryas
Grey fantail, Rhipidura albiscapa
Mangrove fantail, Rhipidura phasiana

Drongos
Order: PasseriformesFamily: Dicruridae

The drongos are mostly black or dark grey in colour, sometimes with metallic tints. They have long forked tails, and some Asian species have elaborate tail decorations. They have short legs and sit very upright when perched, like a shrike. They flycatch or take prey from the ground.

Spangled drongo, Dicrurus bracteatus

Birds-of-Paradise
Order: PasseriformesFamily: Paradisaeidae

The birds-of-paradise are best known for the striking plumage possessed by the males of most species, in particular highly elongated and elaborate feathers extending from the tail, wings or head. These plumes are used in courtship displays to attract females.

Trumpet manucode, Manucodia keraudrenii
Paradise riflebird, Ptiloris paradiseus 
Victoria's riflebird, Ptiloris victoriae  (E)
Magnificent riflebird, Ptiloris magnificus

Monarch flycatchers
Order: PasseriformesFamily: Monarchidae

The monarch flycatchers are small to medium-sized insectivorous passerines which hunt by flycatching.

White-eared monarch, Carterornis leucotis 
Black-faced monarch, Monarcha melanopsis
Black-winged monarch, Monarcha frater
Spectacled monarch, Symposiachrus trivirgatus
Frill-necked monarch, Arses lorealis (E)
Pied monarch, Arses kaupi 
Magpie-lark, Grallina cyanoleuca
Leaden flycatcher, Myiagra rubecula
Broad-billed flycatcher, Myiagra ruficollis
Satin flycatcher, Myiagra cyanoleuca
Restless flycatcher, Myiagra inquieta 
Paperbark flycatcher, Myiagra nana
Shining flycatcher, Myiagra alecto

White-winged chough and apostlebird
Order: PasseriformesFamily: Corcoracidae

They are found in open habitat in eastern Australia, mostly open eucalypt woodlands and some forest that lacks a closed canopy. They are highly social, spend much of their time foraging through leaf litter with a very distinctive gait, calling to one another almost constantly

White-winged chough, Corcorax melanorhamphos 
Apostlebird, Struthidea cinerea

Crows, jays, and magpies
Order: PasseriformesFamily: Corvidae

The family Corvidae includes crows, ravens, jays, choughs, magpies, treepies, nutcrackers and ground jays. Corvids are above average in size among the Passeriformes, and some of the larger species show high levels of intelligence.

House crow, Corvus splendens (A)
Torresian crow, Corvus orru
Little crow, Corvus bennetti 
Australian raven, Corvus coronoides 
Little raven, Corvus mellori (A)
Forest raven, Corvus tasmanicus

Australasian robins
Order: PasseriformesFamily: Petroicidae

Most species of Petroicidae have a stocky build with a large rounded head, a short straight bill and rounded wingtips. They occupy a wide range of wooded habitats, from subalpine to tropical rainforest, and mangrove swamp to semi-arid scrubland. All are primarily insectivores, although a few supplement their diet with seeds.

Jacky-winter, Microeca fascinans
Lemon-bellied flycatcher, Microeca flavigaster
Yellow-legged flycatcher, Microeca griseoceps
Scarlet robin, Petroica multicolor
Flame robin, Petroica phoenicea (A)
Rose robin, Petroica rosea 
Red-capped robin, Petroica goodenovii 
Hooded robin, Melanodryas cucullata 
White-faced robin, Tregellasia leucops
Pale-yellow robin, Tregellasia capito 
Eastern yellow robin, Eopsaltria australis 
Mangrove robin, Eopsaltria pulverulenta
White-browed robin, Poecilodryas superciliosa (E)
Buff-sided robin, Poecilodryas cerviniventris
Ashy robin, Heteromyias albispecularis
Grey-headed robin, Heteromyias cinereifrons (E)
Northern scrub-robin, Drymodes superciliaris (E)

Larks
Order: PasseriformesFamily: Alaudidae

Larks are small terrestrial birds with often extravagant songs and display flights. Most larks are fairly dull in appearance. Their food is insects and seeds.

Horsfield’s bushlark, Mirafra javanica

Cisticolas and allies
Order: PasseriformesFamily: Cisticolidae

The Cisticolidae are warblers found mainly in warmer southern regions of the Old World. They are generally very small birds of drab brown or grey appearance found in open country such as grassland or scrub.

Zitting cisticola, Cisticola juncidis
Golden-headed cisticola, Cisticola exilis

Reed warblers and allies
Order: PasseriformesFamily: Acrocephalidae

The members of this family are usually rather large for "warblers". Most are rather plain olivaceous brown above with much yellow to beige below. They are usually found in open woodland, reedbeds, or tall grass. The family occurs mostly in southern to western Eurasia and surroundings, but it also ranges far into the Pacific, with some species in Africa.

Oriental reed warbler, Acrocephalus orientalis (A)
Australian reed warbler, Acrocephalus australis

Grassbirds and allies
Order: PasseriformesFamily: Locustellidae

Locustellidae are a family of small insectivorous songbirds found mainly in Eurasia, Africa, and the Australian region. They are smallish birds with tails that are usually long and pointed, and tend to be drab brownish or buffy all over.

Spinifexbird, Poodytes carteri 
Little grassbird, Poodytes gramineus
Brown songlark, Cincloramphus cruralis
Rufous songlark, Cincloramphus mathewsi 
Tawny grassbird, Cincloramphus timoriensis

Swallows
Order: PasseriformesFamily: Hirundinidae

The family Hirundinidae is adapted to aerial feeding. They have a slender streamlined body, long pointed wings, and a short bill with a wide gape. The feet are adapted to perching rather than walking, and the front toes are partially joined at the base.

Barn swallow, Hirundo rustica
Welcome swallow, Hirundo neoxena
Red-rumped swallow, Cecropis daurica (A)
Fairy martin, Petrochelidon ariel 
Tree martin, Petrochelidon nigricans
White-backed swallow, Cheramoeca leucosterna

Bulbuls
Order: PasseriformesFamily: Pycnonotidae

Bulbuls are medium-sized songbirds. Some are colourful with yellow, red or orange vents, cheeks, throats or supercilia, but most are drab, with uniform olive-brown to black plumage. Some species have distinct crests.

Red-whiskered bulbul, Pycnonotus jocosus (I)

White-eyes, yuhinas, and allies
Order: PasseriformesFamily: Zosteropidae

The white-eyes are small birds of rather drab appearance, the plumage above being typically greenish-olive, but some species have a white or bright yellow throat, breast, or lower parts, and several have buff flanks. As the name suggests, many species have a white ring around each eye.

Lemon-bellied white-eye, Zosterops chloris
Ashy-bellied white-eye, Zosterops citrinella
Australian yellow white-eye, Zosterops luteus 
Silver-eye, Zosterops lateralis

Starlings
Order: PasseriformesFamily: Sturnidae

Starlings are small to medium-sized passerine birds. Their flight is strong and direct and they are very gregarious. Their preferred habitat is fairly open country. They eat insects and fruit. Plumage is typically dark with a metallic sheen.

Metallic starling, Aplonis metallica
Singing starling, Aplonis cantoroides
European starling, Sturnus vulgaris (I)
Common myna, Acridotheres tristis (I)

Thrushes and allies
Order: PasseriformesFamily: Turdidae

The thrushes are a group of passerine birds that occur mainly in the Old World. They are plump, soft plumaged, small to medium-sized insectivores or sometimes omnivores, often feeding on the ground. Many have attractive songs.

Bassian thrush, Zoothera lunulata
Russet-tailed thrush, Zoothera heinei 
Eurasian blackbird, Turdus merula
Eyebrowed thrush, Turdus obscurus (A)

Old World flycatchers
Order: PasseriformesFamily: Muscicapidae

Old World flycatchers are a large group of small arboreal insectivores. The appearance of these birds is highly varied, but they mostly have weak songs and harsh calls.

Blue rock-thrush, Monticola solitarius (A)
Isabelline wheatear, Oenanthe isabellina (A)

Flowerpeckers
Order: PasseriformesFamily: Dicaeidae

The flowerpeckers are very small, stout, often brightly coloured birds, with short tails, short thick curved bills, and tubular tongues.

Red-capped flowerpecker, Dicaeum geelvinkianum 
Mistletoebird, Dicaeum hirundinaceum

Sunbirds and spiderhunters
Order: PasseriformesFamily: Nectariniidae

The sunbirds and spiderhunters are very small passerine birds which feed largely on nectar, although they will also take insects, especially when feeding young. Their flight is fast and direct on short wings. Most species can take nectar by hovering like a hummingbird, but usually perch to feed.

Olive-backed sunbird, Cinnyris jugularis

Waxbills and allies
Order: PasseriformesFamily: Estrildidae

The estrildid finches are small passerine birds of the Old World tropics and Australasia. They are gregarious and often colonial seed eaters with short thick but pointed bills. They are all similar in structure and habits, but have wide variation in plumage colours and patterns.

Painted firetail, Emblema pictum 
Diamond firetail, Stagonopleura guttata 
Red-browed firetail, Neochmia temporalis
Crimson finch, Neochmia phaeton
Star finch, Bathilda ruficauda 
Plum-headed finch, Aidemosyne modesta 
Zebra finch, Taeniopygia guttata 
Double-barred finch, Stizoptera bichenovii
Masked finch, Poephila personata 
Long-tailed finch, Poephila acuticauda 
Black-throated finch, Poephila cincta 
Blue-faced parrotfinch, Erythrura trichroa
Gouldian finch, Chloebia gouldiae 
Scaly-breasted munia, Lonchura punctulata (I)
Chestnut-breasted munia, Lonchura castaneothorax
Pictorella munia, Heteromunia pectoralis

Old World sparrows
Order: PasseriformesFamily: Passeridae

Old World sparrows are small passerine birds, typically small, plump, brown or grey with short tails and short powerful beaks. They are seed-eaters, but also consume small insects.

House sparrow, Passer domesticus (I)
Eurasian tree sparrow, Passer montanus (I)

Wagtails and pipits
Order: PasseriformesFamily: Motacillidae

Motacillidae is a family of small passerine birds with medium to long tails and comprises the wagtails, longclaws, and pipits. These are slender ground-feeding insectivores of open country.

Grey wagtail, Motacilla cinerea (A)
Eastern yellow wagtail, Motacilla tschutschensis (A)
White wagtail, Motacilla alba (A)
Australian pipit, Anthus australis

Finches, euphonias, and allies
Order: PasseriformesFamily: Fringillidae

Finches are small to moderately large seed-eating passerine birds with a strong beak, usually conical and in some species very large. All have 12 tail feathers and nine primary flight feathers. Finches have a bouncing flight, alternating bouts of flapping with gliding on closed wings, and most sing well.

European greenfinch, Chloris chloris (I)
European goldfinch, Carduelis carduelis (I)

See also
List of birds
Lists of birds by region
List of birds of Australia

References

External links
BirdsAustralia Rarities Committee
BirdsAustralia Checklist
Christidis & Boles Checklist (1993)
Bill Jolly's analysis of Christidis & Boles Checklist (2008)
Birding Western Australia state-lists

Queensland
Birds